Bilge Tarhan may refer to:
 Bilge Tarhan (footballer)
 Bilge Tarhan (gymnast)